The Supercopa de España de Baloncesto 2010 was the 7th edition of the Spanish basketball Supercup. It was played in Vitoria-Gasteiz on 24 and 25 September. Regal FC Barcelona won their fourth title, their second in a row.

Qualified teams

Semifinals

Final

External links
 Official site

Supercopa de España de Baloncesto
2010–11 in Spanish basketball cups